Lawrence E. Fouraker (October 28, 1923 – December 20, 1998) was the sixth dean of the Harvard Business School (1970–1980).

Born in Bryan, Texas, he attended Texas A&M University for his bachelor's degree and received his PhD from The University of Colorado at Boulder.

Selected publication 
Articles

References

External links

1923 births
1998 deaths
Texas A&M University alumni
University of Wyoming faculty
University of Colorado alumni
Pennsylvania State University faculty
Harvard Business School faculty
Deaths from pneumonia in the United States
Business school deans
20th-century American academics